The Roman Catholic Diocese of Baní (erected 8 November 1986) is a suffragan diocese of the Archdiocese of Santo Domingo.

Ordinaries
Príamo Pericles Tejeda Rosario (1986 - 1997) - Bishop Emeritus
Freddy Antonio de Jesús Bretón Martínez (1998 - 2015) - Appointed, Archbishop of Santiago de los Caballeros
Victor Emilio Masalles Pere (2016 -

References

 Official website of the Diocese of Bani 

Bani
Bani
Bani
Bani, Roman Catholic Diocese of
1986 establishments in the Dominican Republic